Sander Arends and Tristan-Samuel Weissborn were the defending champions but lost in the semifinals to Jonathan Eysseric and Antonio Šančić.

Jonathan Erlich and Fabrice Martin won the title after defeating Eysseric and Šančić 7–6(7–2), 7–6(7–2) in the final.

Seeds

Draw

References

External links
 Main draw

Open Harmonie mutuelle - Doubles
2019 Doubles